Kart or KART or Go-kart or similar may refer to:
 Go-kart, a type of small four-wheeled vehicle, motorized or not
 Kart racing, a variant of open-wheel motorsport with small, open, four-wheeled vehicles called karts
 KART (AM), a radio station (1400 AM) licensed to Jerome, Idaho, United States
 Kart’, a town in Armenia
 Kart, Iran, a village in Taybad County, Razavi Khorasan Province, Iran
 Go-Kart Records, a record label
 Korea National University of Arts (K-ARTS), a national university in South Korea
 Watertown International Airport in Watertown, New York (ICAO: KART)

See also 
 Card (disambiguation)
 Cart (disambiguation)
 Kard, a type of Islamic knife
 Kart racing game, a video game genre
 Kärt, Estonian feminine given name